Dirck de Bray (c. 1635 in Haarlem – 1694 in Goch) was a Dutch Golden Age painter.

Biography
According to Houbraken he was a multi-talented son and pupil of the painter and architect Salomon de Bray.  He was known as a flower painter, but he could also sculpt. He carved a wooden bust of his father's head, that Houbraken admired and used for his engraving of Salomon in his "Schouburg". He became a monk in the Gaesdonck monastery near Goch. 
He became a member of the Haarlem Guild of St. Luke in 1671. Dirck was born into an artistic family. His brother Jan became a well-known painter, and his brother Joseph was also a painter, though he died young. His sister Cornelia married Jan Lievens. His mother was Anna Westerbaen, the sister of the painter Jan Westerbaen, and the poet Jacob Westerbaen.  He was a printmaker and painted flower- and hunting still lifes. After 1678 he moved to the Gaesdonck monastery.

References

External links
Works and literature on PubHist
Dirck de Bray on Artnet
Print after his design by Jan de Visscher and with a poem by his father; showing the young priest Simon van der Plas of Spaarnwoude (Geheugen van Nederland)

1635 births
1694 deaths
Artists from Haarlem
Dutch Golden Age painters
Dutch male painters
Dutch Golden Age architects
Dutch draughtsmen
Painters from Haarlem
Woodcarvers